Spickernell, also spelled Spicknell, is an English surname, derived from the Middle English spigurnel, a 'sealer of writs'.

Sources
The Origin of English Surnames by P. H. Reaney, published by Routledge & Keagan Paul (1967)

Notes

English-language surnames